Widowmaker was debut album by the English hard rock band Widowmaker, which was released in February 1976. Widowmaker reached #196 in US and featured an eclectic mix of blues, country, folk and hard rock.

Track listing 
"Such a Shame" (Daisley)
"Pin a Rose on Me" (Ellis, Grosvenor, Nichols)
"On the Road" (Ellis, Grosvenor, Nichols)
"Straight Faced Fighter" (Ellis)
"Ain't Telling You Nothing" (Bender, Ellis)
"When I Met You" (Grosvenor)
"Leave the Kids Alone" (Ellis)
"Shine a Light On Me" (Grosvenor, Wright)
"Running Free" (John Farnham)
"Got a Dream" (Daisley)

Personnel 

 Steve Ellis – vocals
 Ariel Bender – guitar
 Huw Lloyd-Langton – guitar
 Bob Daisley – bass
 Paul Nicholls – drums

Additional personnel
 Bobby Tench – vocals
 Zoot Money – keyboards

Singles

Taken from the album
"On the Road" / "Pin a Rose on Me" (1976, Jet JET 766)
"When I Met You" / "Pin a Rose on Me" (1976, Jet JET 767)
"Pin a Rose on Me" / "On the Road" (1976, Jet JET 782)

Notes

References

 Joynson, Vernon. The Tapestry of Delights - The Comprehensive Guide to British Music of the Beat, R&B, Psychedelic and Progressive Eras 1963-1976. Borderline (2006). Reprinted (2008). 
 Larkin Colin. The Guinness Encyclopedia of Popular Music: Threepenny Opera-Z.Z. Top Volume 6. Guinness Publications (1995). 

1976 debut albums
Jet Records albums
United Artists Records albums